Gabriel Gómez Michel (24 March 1965 – 22 or 23 September 2014) was a Mexican paediatrician, academic, and politician affiliated with the PRI; he served as Deputy of the LXII Legislature of the Mexican Congress representing Jalisco.

Gómez was kidnapped and murdered in September 2014.

References

1965 births
21st-century Mexican politicians
2014 deaths
2014 murders in Mexico
Assassinated Mexican politicians
Institutional Revolutionary Party politicians
Deputies of the LXII Legislature of Mexico
Kidnapped Mexican people
Politicians from Jalisco
Mexican paediatricians
University of Guadalajara alumni
Members of the Chamber of Deputies (Mexico) for Jalisco
People murdered in Mexico